Filateliya (Philately) or formerly Filateliya SSSR (Philately of the USSR) is a Russian central philatelic magazine. It first appeared in 1966 as the monthly bulletin Filateliya SSSR and was issued by the USSR Ministry of Communications. The magazine content includes the history and design of postage stamps, and other related themes.

History 
The bulletin Filateliya SSSR was published monthly in Moscow since 1966. Its predecessor was the magazine Sovetskii Filatelist (Soviet Philatelist).

The bulletin (later, magazine) included the following information:
 announcements of new postage stamp issues,
 information about research in postal and philatelic history,
 information about thematic collecting,
 news about the activities of the All-Union Society of Philatelists,
 news about the philatelic organisations in other socialist countries,
 a section for junior philatelists.

The magazine repeatedly won awards at international philatelic exhibitions. Its circulation was approximately 100,000 copies (in 1977).
 
In 1991, the last year of the USSR existence, the magazine was printed with the circulation of about 44,000 copies. Since then, it was published under the new name of Filateliya.

See also 
 Boris Balashov
 Kollektsioner
 List of philatelic magazines
 Manfred Dobin
 Soviet Philatelist

Notes

References

External links 
 

Philately of the Soviet Union
Philately of Russia
1966 establishments in the Soviet Union
Philatelic periodicals
Monthly magazines published in Russia
Russian-language magazines
Magazines established in 1966
Magazines published in the Soviet Union
Magazines published in Moscow